Chef Eric Tia (born 28 November 1998) is an Ivorian professional footballer who plays as a forward for the Swiss club Bellinzona.

Professional career
In January 2014, Chef arrived in Switzerland as an asylum seeker. He soon joined Chur 97 after asking to try out, and worked his way into their first team soon after. On 18 February 2019, Tia signed a professional contract with FC Luzern. Chef made his professional debut with Luzern in a 1–0 Swiss Super League win over Servette FC on 4 August 2019.

For the 2021–22 season, he joined Bellinzona in the third-tier Swiss Promotion League. Upon his debut for Bellinzona, he appeared in all five top levels of the Swiss football leagues, from Swiss Super League to 2. Liga Interregional.

References

External links
 
 SFL Profile
 Sport.de profile

1996 births
Footballers from Abidjan
Living people
Ivorian footballers
FC Chur 97 players
FC Zürich players
FC Luzern players
Neuchâtel Xamax FCS players
AC Bellinzona players
2. Liga Interregional players
Swiss Promotion League players
Swiss Super League players
Swiss 1. Liga (football) players
Swiss Challenge League players
Association football forwards
Ivorian expatriate footballers
Expatriate footballers in Switzerland
Ivorian expatriate sportspeople in Switzerland